Varroa destructor, the Varroa mite is an external parasitic mite that attacks and feeds on the honey bees Apis mellifera and Apis cerana. The disease caused by the mites is called varroosis.

The Varroa mite can reproduce only in a honey bee colony. It attaches to the body of the bee and weakens the bee by sucking fat bodies. The species is a vector for at least five debilitating bee viruses, including RNA viruses such as the deformed wing virus (DWV). A significant mite infestation leads to the death of a honey bee colony, usually in the late autumn through early spring. The Varroa mite is the parasite with possibly the most pronounced economic impact on the beekeeping industry. Varroa is considered to be one of multiple stress factors contributing to the higher levels of bee losses around the world.

Physical description

The adult female mite is reddish-brown in color, while the male is white. Varroa mites are flat, having a button shape. They are 1–1.8 mm long and 1.5–2 mm wide, and have eight legs. Varroa mites lack eyes. One mite weighs approximately 0.453 mg.

Reproduction, feeding, infection, and hive mortality
Mites reproduce on a 10-day cycle. The female mite enters a honey bee brood cell. As soon as the cell is capped, the Varroa mite lays eggs on the larva. The young mites, typically several females and one male, hatch in about the same time as the young bee develops and leave the cell with the host. When the young bee emerges from the cell after pupation, the Varroa mites also leave and spread to other bees and larvae. The mite preferentially infest drone cells, allowing the mite to reproduce one more time with the extra three days it takes a drone to emerge compared to a worker bee. This can cause genetic defects such as useless wings or viruses and fungi in the bee.

Adult mites suck on the fat body of both adult bees and bee larvae for sustenance. As the fat body is crucial for many bodily functions such as hormone and energy regulation, immunity, and pesticide detoxification, the bee is left in a severely weakened state. Adult mites live and feed under the abdominal plates of adult bees primarily on the underside of the metasoma region on the left side of the bee. Adult mites are more often identified as present in the hive when on top of the adult bee on the mesosoma region, but research suggests that mites in this location are not feeding, but rather attempting to transfer to another bee.  

Open wounds left by the feeding become sites for disease and virus infections. The mites are vectors for at least five and possibly up to 18 debilitating bee viruses, including RNA viruses such as the deformed wing virus. With the exception of some resistance in the Russian strains and bees that have Varroa-sensitive hygiene (about 10% of colonies naturally have it), European Apis mellifera bees are almost completely defenseless against these parasites. (Russian honey bees are one-third to one-half less susceptible to mite reproduction).

The model for the population dynamics is exponential growth when bee broods are available, and exponential decline when no brood is available. In 12 weeks, the number of mites in a western honey bee hive can multiply by (roughly) 12. Mites often invade colonies in the summer, leading to high mite populations in autumn. High mite populations in the autumn can cause a crisis when drone rearing ceases and the mites switch to worker larvae, causing a quick population crash and often hive death.

Once infected with a V. destructor mite, the honey bee may be damaged two ways. Firstly, the mite's consumption of the fat body weakens both the adult bee and the larva; in particular, it significantly decreases the weight of both the hatching and adult bee. Additionally, infected adult worker bees have a shorter lifespan than ordinary worker bees, and they furthermore tend to be absent from the colony far more than ordinary bees, which could be due to their reduced ability to navigate or regulate their energy for flight. Secondly, the mites are vectors of various viruses, in particular the deformed wing virus.

After the initial developmental stages, when the young bee matures, it leaves the brood cell and takes the mite with it. V. destructor then leaves the young bee for an older one, preferably for a nurse bee, because nurse bees spend more time near the brood, giving the mite more ample opportunity to reproduce. In fact, because the nurse bee spends more time around the drone brood rather than the worker brood, many more drones are infected with the mites.

Varroa mites have been found on tricial larvae of some wasp species, such as Vespula vulgaris, and flower-feeding insects such as the bumblebee, Bombus pensylvanicus, the scarab beetle, Phanaeus vindex, and the flower-fly, Palpada vinetorum. It parasitizes the young larvae and feeds on the internal organs of the hosts. Although the Varroa mite cannot reproduce on these insects, its presence on them may be a means by which it spreads short distances (phoresy).

Introduction around the world
Varroa mites originally only occurred in Asia, on the Asian honeybee, Apis cerana, but this species has been introduced to many other countries on several continents, resulting in disastrous infestations of European honeybees.
 1909–1958 Japan (first on A. cerana, then on A. mellifera)
 Prior to 1965 USSR (European Russia)
 1967 Bulgaria
 1975 Romania
 1977 West Germany
 1970s Brazil
 Late 1970s South America
 1980 Poland
 1982 France
 1984 Switzerland, Spain, Italy
 1987 Portugal
 1987 United States
 1989 Canada
 1992 United Kingdom
 1992 Malta
 1998 Ireland
 2000 New Zealand (North Island)
 2006 New Zealand (South Island)
 2007 Hawaii (Oahu, Hawaii Island)
 2008 Hawaii (Big Island)
 2022 Australia
In early 2010, an isolated subspecies of honey bee was discovered in the oasis of Kufra (southeastern Libya), this newly discovered bee is the only known subspecies that is Varroa free. The Hawaiian islands of Maui and Kauai are free of the mite.

Identification
Until recently, V. destructor was thought to be a closely related mite species called Varroa jacobsoni. Both species parasitize the Asian honey bee, A. cerana. However, the species originally described as V. jacobsoni by Anthonie Cornelis Oudemans in 1904 is not the same species that also attacks A. mellifera. The jump to A. mellifera probably first took place in the Philippines in the early 1960s, where imported A. mellifera came into close contact with infected A. cerana. Until 2000, scientists had not identified V. destructor as a separate species. This late identification in 2000 by Anderson and Trueman corrected some previous confusion and mislabeling in the scientific literature.

Varroosis
The infestation and subsequent parasitic disease caused by Varroa mites is called varroosis. Sometimes, the incorrect names varroatosis or varroasis are used. A parasitic disease name must be formed from the taxonomic name of the parasite and the suffix -osis as provided in the Standardised Nomenclature by the World Association for the Advancement of Veterinary Parasitology. For example, the World Organisation for Animal Health (OIE) uses the name varroosis in the OIE Terrestrial Manual.

Treatments have met with limited success. First, the bees were medicated with fluvalinate, a synthetic pyrethroid, which had about 95% mite falls. However, the last 5% became resistant to it, and later, almost immune. Fluvalinate was followed by coumaphos, which mites also have developed resistance to.

Control or preventive measures and treatment

Monitoring 
Several methods exist for monitoring levels of Varroa mites in a colony. For a powdered sugar roll, the sampler collects about 300 bees using a 1/2-cup measuring cup and places them in a jar with a wire mesh screen lid (1/8") along with 2 tablespoons of powdered sugar. They then gently swirl the bees for about a minute before turning the jar upside down and shaking for two minutes over a tray to capture the mites as they fall. Those mites are then counted, and the count is divided by three to find the number of mites per 100 bees. The sugar roll is typically done with the intent to prevent killing the sampled bees, but whether the vigorous shaking causes damage is not known. For an alcohol wash, which is the most effective method, the sampler collects about 300 bees using the same cup. The bees are submerged in alcohol with a concentration of 70% or higher. A lid is placed over the jar to seal it, and the mixture is shaken vigorously for two minutes before it is poured over a 1/8" wire mesh screen into a tray. The mites are then counted, and the resulting number is also divided by three. This method kills all sampled bees. The sticky board method does not kill any bees. For this method, a sticky board with a thick coating of petroleum jelly is placed under the brood chamber under a screened bottom board (or similar 1/8" wire mesh screen). The board is retrieved after three days, and the beekeeper takes a count of the mites on the board. This number is divided by three to find the average 24-hour mite drop. This method does not kill any bees, but takes longer for results.

Chemical measures

Varroa mites can be treated with commercially available acaricides. Acaricides must be applied carefully to minimize the contamination of honey that might be consumed by humans. Proper use of miticides also slows the development of resistance by the mites.

Synthetic chemicals
Pyrethroid insecticide (fluvalinate) as strips
Amitraz, as strips
Organophosphate insecticide (Coumaphos or Check-mite) as strips
Manley's Thymol Crystal and surgical spirit recipe with sugar as food
StopVarroa, made with oxalic acid

Naturally occurring chemicals
Formic acid as vapor or pads (Mite-Away)
Powdered sugar (Dowda method), talc, or other "safe" powders with a grain size between  can be sprinkled on the bees.
Essential oils, especially lemon, mint, and thyme oil
Sugar esters (Sucrocide) in spray application
Oxalic acid trickling method or applied as vapor
Mineral oil (food grade) as vapor and in direct application on paper or cords
Beta acid found in hops in strip application (Hopguard)

However, the most effective long-term way of protecting bees against V. destructor is by breeding bees that are resistant to these mites.

Physical, mechanical, behavioral methods
Varroa mites can also be controlled through nonchemical means. Most of these controls are intended to reduce the mite population to a manageable level, not to eliminate the mites completely.

Perforated bottom board method is used by many beekeepers on their hives. When mites occasionally fall off a bee, they must climb back up to parasitize another bee. If the beehive has a screened floor with mesh the right size, the mite falls through and cannot return to the beehive. The screened bottom board is also being credited with increased circulation of air, which reduces condensation in a hive during the winter. Studies at Cornell University done over two years found that screened bottoms have no measurable effect at all. Screened bottom boards with sticky boards (glue traps) separate mites that fall through the screen and the sticky board prevents them from crawling back up.
Heating method, first used by beekeepers in Eastern Europe in the 1970s, later became a global method. In this method, hive frames are heated to at least 104 °F (40 °C) for several hours at a time, which causes the mites to drop from the bees.  When combined with the perforated bottom board method, this can control mites sufficiently to aid colony survival. In Germany, anti-varroa heaters are manufactured for use by professional beekeepers. A thermosolar hive has been patented and manufactured in the Czech Republic.
Limited drone brood cell method limits the brood space cell for Varroa mites to inhabit (4.9 mm across—about 0.5 mm smaller than standard), and also enhances the difference in size between worker and drone brood, with the intention of making the drone comb traps more effective in trapping Varroa mites. Small cell foundations have staunch advocates, though controlled studies have been generally inconclusive.
Comb trapping method (also known as the swarming method) is based on interrupting the honey bee brood cycle. It is an advanced method that removes capped brood from the hive, where the Varroa mites breed. The queen is confined to a comb using a comb cage. At 9-day intervals, the queen is confined to a new comb, and the brood in the old comb is left to be reared. The brood in the previous comb, now capped and infested with Varroa mites, is removed. The cycle is repeated. This complex method can remove up to 80% of Varroa mites in the hive.
Freezing drone brood method takes advantage of the Varroa mites' preference for longer living drone brood. The beekeeper puts a frame in the hive that is sized to encourage the queen to lay primarily drone brood. Once the brood is capped, the beekeeper removes the frame and puts it in the freezer. This kills the Varroa mites feeding on those bees. It also kills the drone brood, but most hives produce an excess of drone bees, so it is not generally considered a loss. After freezing, the frame can be returned to the hive. The nurse bees clean out the dead brood (and dead mites) and the cycle continues.
Drone brood excision method is a variation applicable to top bar hives. Honey bees tend to place combs suitable for drone brood along the bottom and outer margins of the comb. Cutting this off at a late stage of development ("purple eye stage") and discarding it reduces the mite load on the colony. It also allows for inspection and counting of mites on the brood.

Developments using Genetic Technologies
Researchers have been able to use RNA interference to knock out genes in the Varroa mite. Efforts also have been made to breed for changes in the honey bees. Two strains have been developed in the United States that can detect damaged pupae under cappings and remove them before the infestation spreads further.  The “IN”/Indiana strain is under development at Purdue University to develop lines that groom off and bite phoretic Varroa to kill the mites.

See also
Colony collapse disorder

References

Further reading

Varroa Mite Controls Apiculture Factsheet #221, Ministry of Agriculture, Food and Fisheries, Government of British Columbia; April 2004
 Oils for Varroa Control Botanicals For Mite Control, Canadian Honey Council, 3/16/2003

External links 

Varroa mite on the University of Florida / Institute of Food and Agricultural Sciences Featured Creatures website
The ectoparasite mite Varroa destructor Anderson and Trueman in southeastern Brazil apiaries

Mesostigmata
Arachnids of Asia
Beekeeping
Western honey bee pests
Parasites of bees
Parasitic acari
Agricultural pest mites
Animals described in 2000